Charowa dam, (also known as Charwa dam), is situated in the midst of four hills in Hazaribagh district, Jharkhand, India. The Charawa dam reservoir is known to fill up beyond the safe level during the monsoon, most recently in 2017, when spill gates were opened to prevent unsafe levels.

The reservoir is home to various vulture species, including the largest and the smallest vultures, the Himalayan  vulture and the Egyptian vulture respectively. Critically Endangered species like the Indian vulture and White-rumped vulture are also found here.

References

Dams in Jharkhand
Hazaribagh district
Year of establishment missing